Alucita agapeta is a species of moth of the family Alucitidae. It is found in Australia.

External links

Australian Faunal Directory

Moths of Australia
Alucitidae
Moths described in 1913
Taxa named by Alfred Jefferis Turner